Lothe is a common family name in Scandinavian countries. It may refer to:
Anders A. Lothe, 1875–1961), Norwegian teacher, newspaper editor and politician
Bjørn Lothe (1952–2009), Norwegian politician 
Egil Lothe (1908–1990), Norwegian economist and civil servant.
Håvard Lothe (b. 1982), Norwegian musician
 (1914–after 1945), guilty of crimes at Bergen-Belsen
Jakob Lothe (b. 1950), Norwegian literary scholar and professor of English Literature
Jakob Mathias Antonson Lothe (1881–1975) was a Norwegian politician
Odd Erik Lothe, Norwegian singer known as Lothe